Treponema pallidum, formerly known as Spirochaeta pallida, is a spirochaete bacterium with various subspecies that cause the diseases syphilis, bejel (also known as endemic syphilis), and yaws. It is transmitted only among humans. It is a helically coiled microorganism usually 6–15 μm long and 0.1–0.2 μm wide. T. pallidum's lack of either a tricarboxylic acid cycle or oxidative phosphorylation results in minimal metabolic activity. The treponemes have a cytoplasmic and an outer membrane. Using light microscopy, treponemes are visible only by using dark field illumination. Treponema pallidum consists of three subspecies, T. p. pallidum, T. p. endemicum, and T. p. pertenue, each of which has a distinct associated disease.

Subspecies
Three subspecies of T. pallidum are known:
 Treponema pallidum pallidum, which causes syphilis
 T. p. endemicum, which causes bejel or endemic syphilis
 T. p. pertenue, which causes yaws

The three subspecies causing yaws, bejel, and syphilis are morphologically and serologically indistinguishable. These bacteria were originally classified as members of separate species, but DNA hybridization analysis indicates they are members of the same species. Treponema carateum, the cause of pinta, remains a separate species because no isolate is available for DNA analysis. Disease transmittance in subspecies T. p. endemicum and T. p. pertenue is considered non-venereal. T. p. pallidum is the most invasive pathogenic subspecies while T. p. carateum is the least invasive of the subspecies. T. p. endemicum and T. p. pertenue are intermediately invasive.

Microbiology

Ultrastructure
Treponema pallidum is a helically shaped bacterium with high mobility consisting of an outer membrane, peptidoglycan layer, inner membrane, protoplasmic cylinder, and periplasmic space. It is often described as Gram negative, but its outer membrane lacks lipopolysaccharide, which is found in the outer membrane of other Gram-negative bacteria. It has an endoflagellum (periplasmic flagellum) consisting of four main polypeptides, a core structure, and a sheath. The flagellum is located within the periplasmic space and wraps around the protoplasmic cylinder. T. pallidum's outer membrane has the most contact with host cells and contains few transmembrane proteins, limiting antigenicity while its cytoplasmic membrane is covered in lipoproteins. The outer membrane's treponemal ligands main function is attachment to host cells, with functional and antigenic relatedness between ligands. The genus Treponema has ribbons of cytoskeletal cytoplasmic filaments that run the length of the cell just underneath the cytoplasmic membrane. They are composed of the intermediate filament-like protein CfpA (cytoplasmic filament protein A). Although the filaments may be involved in chromosome structure and segregation or cell division, their precise function is unknown.

Outer Membrane Proteins 
Treponemal outer membrane proteins are key factors for its pathogenesis, persistence and immune evasion strategies.

TP0326 
TP0326 is an ortholog of BamA. BamA apparatus will insert newly synthetised and exported outer membrane proteins into the outer membrane

Treponema repeat family of proteins 
Treponema repeat family of proteins, Tpr for short, are proteins expressed during the infection process. Tprs are formed by a conserved N-terminal domain, an amino-terminal stretch of about 50 aminoacids, a central variable region and a conserved C-terminal domain .There are many different types of tpr: tprA, tprB, tprC, tprD, tprE…However, variability of tprK is the most relevant due to the immune scape characteristics it allows.

Antigen variation in TprK is regulated by gene conversion. In this way,  fragments of the seven variable regions (V1–V7) present in tprK and the 53 donor sites of tprD can be combined to produce new structured sequences. TprK antigen variation can help Treponema pallidum to evade a strong host immune reaction and it can also allow the reinfection of individuals. This is possible because the newly structured proteins can avoid antibody specific recognition.

In order to introduce more phenotypic diversity, Treponema pallidum may undergo phase variation. This process will mainly happen in tprF, tprI, tprG, tprJ, tprL and it consists of a reversible expansion or contraction of polymeric repeats. These size variations can help the bacterium to quickly adapt to its microenvironment, dodge immune response or even increase affinity to host.

Culture
Successful long-term cultivation of T. pallidum subspecies pallidum in a tissue culture system has been reported in 2018.

However, because T. pallidum cannot be grown in a pure culture, it does not satisfy Koch's Postulates.

Genome
The chromosomes of the T. pallidum subspecies are small, about 1.14 Mbp. Their DNA sequences are more than 99.7% identical.  T. pallidum subspecies pallidum was sequenced in 1998. This sequencing is significant due to T. pallidum not being capable of growing in a pure culture, meaning that this sequencing played an important role in understanding the microbe's functions. It revealed that T. pallidum relies on its host for many molecules provided by biosynthetic pathways, and that it is missing genes responsible for encoding key enzymes in oxidative phosphorylation and the tricarboxylic acid cycle. It was found that this is due to 5% of T. pallidum's genes coding for transport genes. The recent sequencing of the genomes of several spirochetes permits a thorough analysis of the similarities and differences within this bacterial phylum and within the species. T. p. pallidum has one of the smallest bacterial genomes at 1.14 million base pairs, and has limited metabolic capabilities, reflecting its adaptation through genome reduction to the rich environment of mammalian tissue. The shape of T. pallidum is flat and wavy. In order to avoid antibodies attacking, the cell has few proteins exposed on the outer membrane sheath. Its chromosome of about 1000 kilo base pairs is circular with a 52.8% G + C average. Sequencing has revealed a bundle of twelve proteins and some putative hemolysins are potential virulence factors of T. pallidum. 92.9% of DNA was determined to be ORF's, 55% of which had predicted biological functions.

Clinical significance
The clinical features of syphilis, yaws, and bejel occur in multiple stages that affect the skin. The skin lesions observed in the early stage last for weeks or months. The skin lesions are highly infectious, and the spirochetes in the lesions are transmitted by direct contact. The lesions regress as the immune response develops against T. pallidum. The latent stage that results lasts a lifetime in many cases. In a minority of cases, the disease exits latency and enters a tertiary phase, in which destructive lesions of skin, bone, and cartilage ensue. Unlike yaws and bejels, syphilis in its tertiary stage often affects the heart, eyes, and nervous system as well.

Syphilis

Treponema pallidum pallidum is a motile spirochaete that is generally acquired by close sexual contact, entering the host via breaches in squamous or columnar epithelium. The organism can also be transmitted to a fetus by transplacental passage during the later stages of pregnancy, giving rise to congenital syphilis. The helical structure of T. p. pallidum allows it to move in a corkscrew motion through mucous membranes or enter minuscule breaks in the skin.  In women the initial lesion is usually on the labia, the walls of the vagina, or the cervix; in men it is on the shaft or glans of the penis. It gains access to the host's blood and lymph systems through tissue and mucous membranes. In more severe cases, it may gain access to the host by infecting the skeletal bones and central nervous system of the body.

The incubation period for a T. p. pallidum infection is usually around 21 days, but can range from 10 to 90 days.

Laboratory identification

Treponema pallidum was first microscopically identified in syphilitic chancres by Fritz Schaudinn and Erich Hoffmann at the Charité in Berlin in 1905. This bacterium can be detected with special stains, such as the Dieterle stain.  T. pallidum is also detected by serology, including nontreponemal VDRL, rapid plasma reagin, treponemal antibody tests (FTA-ABS), T. pallidum immobilization reaction, and syphilis TPHA test.

Treatment
During the early 1940s, rabbit models in combination with the drug penicillin allowed for a long term drug treatment. These experiments establish the ground work that modern scientists use for syphilis therapy. Penicillin can inhibit T. pallidum in 6–8 hours though the cells still remain in lymph nodes and regenerate. Penicillin is not the only drug that can be used to inhibit T. pallidum; it has been found that any β-lactam antibiotics or macrolides can be used. The T. pallidum strain 14 has built resistance to some macrolides, including erythromycin and azithromycin. Resistance to macrolides in T. Pallidum strain 14 is believed to derive from a single point mutation that increased the organism's livability. Many of the syphilis treatment therapies only lead to bacteriostatic results, unless larger concentrations of penicillin are used for bactericidal effects. Penicillin overall is the most recommended antibiotic by the CDC as it shows the best results with prolonged usage. It can inhibit and may even kill T. Pallidum at low to high doses with each increase in concentration being more effective.

Vaccine
No vaccine for syphilis is available as of 2017. The outer membrane of T. pallidum has too few surface proteins for an antibody to be effective. Efforts to develop a safe and effective syphilis vaccine have been hindered by uncertainty about the relative importance of humoral and cellular mechanisms to protective immunity, and because T. pallidum outer membrane proteins have not been unambiguously identified. In contrast, some of the known antigens are intracellular, and antibodies are ineffective against them to clear the infection.

References

Further reading

External links
 "Syphilis- CDC Fact Sheet." Centers for Disease Control and Prevention. May. 2004. Centers for Disease Control and Prevention. 7 February 2006

pallidum
Syphilis
Bacteria described in 1905